Paweł Linka (born June 26, 1986 in Poznań) is a Polish professional football goalkeeper who played in the Ekstraklasa for Amica Wronki, Lech Poznań and Odra Wodzisław.

External links
 

1986 births
Living people
Polish footballers
Association football goalkeepers
Amica Wronki players
Lech Poznań players
Promień Żary players
Odra Wodzisław Śląski players
Xanthi F.C. players
Podbeskidzie Bielsko-Biała players
Footballers from Poznań